The 2022–23 Perth Wildcats season was the 42nd season of the franchise in the National Basketball League (NBL), and their first under the leadership of their new head coach John Rillie.

Roster

Standings

Ladder 

The NBL tie-breaker system as outlined in the NBL Rules and Regulations states that in the case of an identical win–loss record, the overall points percentage will determine order of seeding.

Ladder progression

Game log

Pre-season 

|-style="background:#BBF3BB;"
| 1
| 9 September
| Adelaide
| W 98–87
| Bryce Cotton (20)
| Luke Travers (9)
| Mitch Norton (6)
| Eaton Recreration Centre300
| 1–0
|-style="background:#BBF3BB;"
| 2
| 11 September
| Adelaide
| W 97–91
| Brady Manek (15)
| Corey Webster (6)
| Bryce Cotton (5)
| HBF Arena500
| 2–0

NBL Blitz 

|-style="background:#BBF3BB;"
| 1
| 17 September
| Cairns
| W 98–80
| Bryce Cotton (36)
| Blanchfield, Travers (7)
| Bryce Cotton (4)
| Darwin Basketball Facility916
| 1–0
|-style="background:#BBF3BB;"
| 2
| 19 September
| S.E. Melbourne
| W 87–71
| Corey Webster (16)
| Brady Manek (9)
| Bryce Cotton (5)
| Darwin Basketball Facility838
| 2–0
|-style="background:#FFBBBB;"
| 3
| 21 September
| @ Melbourne
| L 90–63
| Thomas, Webster (10)
| Bryce Cotton (7)
| Luke Travers (4)
| Darwin Basketball Facility917
| 2–1

Regular season 

|-style="background:#BBF3BB;"
| 1
| 2 October
| Brisbane
| W 87–73
| Bryce Cotton (23)
| Bryce Cotton (12)
| Luke Travers (7)
| RAC Arena11,083
| 1–0
|-style="background:#BBF3BB;"
| 2
| 8 October
| Illawarra
| W 77–71
| Norton, Travers (14)
| Manek, Travers (7)
| Cotton, Travers (4)
| RAC Arena10,816
| 2–0
|-style="background:#BBF3BB;"
| 3
| 10 October
| @ Cairns
| W 76–105
| Bryce Cotton (24)
| Luke Travers (9)
| Mitch Norton (9)
| Cairns Convention Centre3,608
| 3–0
|-style="background:#FFBBBB;"
| 4
| 14 October
| Melbourne
| L 81–84
| Bryce Cotton (32)
| Jesse Wagstaff (8)
| Luke Travers (8)
| RAC Arena10,441
| 3–1
|-style="background:#FFBBBB;"
| 5
| 22 October
| @ Tasmania
| L 103–72
| Bryce Cotton (14)
| Luke Travers (8)
| Bryce Cotton (4)
| MyState Bank Arena4,231
| 3–2
|-style="background:#FFBBBB;"
| 6
| 28 October
| S.E. Melbourne
| L 90–91
| Bryce Cotton (27)
| Blanchfield, Thomas (6)
| Bryce Cotton (8)
| RAC Arena11,103
| 3–3
|-style="background:#FFBBBB;"
| 7
| 31 October
| @ Melbourne
| L 94–77
| Bryce Cotton (19)
| TaShawn Thomas (7)
| TaShawn Thomas (5)
| John Cain Arena6,610
| 3–4

|-style="background:#FFBBBB;"
| 8
| 3 November
| Tasmania
| L 77–85
| Bryce Cotton (26)
| Cotton, Majok, Norton, Thomas (5)
| Bryce Cotton (6)
| RAC Arena9,805
| 3–5
|-style="background:#BBF3BB;"
| 9
| 5 November
| @ Adelaide
| W 89–94
| Brady Manek (25)
| TaShawn Thomas (9)
| Bryce Cotton (5)
| Adelaide Entertainment Centre9,071
| 4–5
|-style="background:#BBF3BB;"
| 10
| 17 November
| S.E. Melbourne
| W 103–96
| Bryce Cotton (32)
| Jesse Wagstaff (6)
| TaShawn Thomas (6)
| RAC Arena9,988
| 5–5
|-style="background:#FFBBBB;"
| 11
| 24 November
| Adelaide
| L 82–96
| Bryce Cotton (17)
| TaShawn Thomas (6)
| Bryce Cotton (5)
| RAC Arena10,329
| 5–6

|-style="background:#FFBBBB;"
| 12
| 1 December
| @ Brisbane
| L 106–94 (OT)
| Bryce Cotton (30)
| Luke Travers (8)
| Luke Travers (4)
| Nissan Arena2,427
| 5–7
|-style="background:#BBF3BB;"
| 13
| 3 December
| @ New Zealand
| W 84–92
| Corey Webster (26)
| Cotton, Manek, Thomas (6)
| Bryce Cotton (7)
| Spark Arena4,884
| 6–7
|-style="background:#BBF3BB;"
| 14
| 9 December
| @ Adelaide
| W 90–98
| Bryce Cotton (32)
| TaShawn Thomas (8)
| Bryce Cotton (6)
| Adelaide Entertainment Centre5,436
| 7–7
|-style="background:#BBF3BB;"
| 15
| 12 December
| Melbourne
| W 90–89
| Bryce Cotton (29)
| TaShawn Thomas (7)
| Luke Travers (5)
| RAC Arena10,459
| 8–7
|- style="background:#CCCCCC;"
| –
| 16 December
| New Zealand
| colspan="6" | Postponed (COVID-19) (Makeup date: 10 January)
|-style="background:#BBF3BB;"
| 16
| 20 December 
| @ Cairns
| W 83–105
| Bryce Cotton (24)
| TaShawn Thomas (12)
| TaShawn Thomas (6)
| Cairns Convention Centre3,752
| 9–7
|-style="background:#FFBBBB;"
| 17
| 27 December
| @ Brisbane
| L 97–93 (OT)
| Bryce Cotton (30)
| Luke Travers (10)
| Bryce Cotton (6)
| Nissan Arena3,737
| 9–8
|-style="background:#BBF3BB;"
| 18
| 31 December
| @ Illawarra
| W 97–107
| Corey Webster (25)
| Brady Manek (10)
| Bryce Cotton (6)
| WIN Entertainment Centre3,776
| 10–8

|-style="background:#FFBBBB;"
| 19
| 4 January
| @ New Zealand
| L 97–94
| Bryce Cotton (32)
| Brady Manek (7)
| Bryce Cotton (5)
| TSB Stadium2,200
| 10–9
|-style="background:#FFBBBB;"
| 20
| 7 January
| @ Sydney
| L 108–87
| Cotton, C.Webster (22)
| TaShawn Thomas (8)
| Bryce Cotton (5)
| Qudos Bank Arena11,073
| 10–10
|-style="background:#BBF3BB;"
| 21
| 10 January
| New Zealand
| W 93–90
| TaShawn Thomas (23)
| TaShawn Thomas (10)
| Cotton, Manek, Thomas, C.Webster (3)
| RAC Arena11,668
| 11–10
|-style="background:#BBF3BB;"
| 22
| 14 January
| Adelaide
| W 112–97
| Cotton, Manek (23)
| Brady Manek (10)
| Tai Webster (7)
| RAC Arena13,087
| 12–10
|-style="background:#BBF3BB;"
| 23
| 20 January
| Sydney
| W 111–104
| Cotton, Manek (21)
| Corey Webster (10)
| Bryce Cotton (11)
| RAC Arena13,038
| 13–10
|-style="background:#FFBBBB;"
| 24
| 22 January
| @ S.E. Melbourne
| L 112–91
| Bryce Cotton (25)
| Cotton, Travers (5)
| Luke Travers (5)
| State Basketball Centre3,300
| 13–11
|-style="background:#BBF3BB;"
| 25
| 27 January
| Illawarra
| W 106–86
| Bryce Cotton (40)
| Cotton, Manek, Travers, C.Webster (7)
| Cotton, Wagstaff (4)
| RAC Arena12,251
| 14–11
|-style="background:#FFBBBB;"
| 26
| 29 January
| @ Tasmania
| L 102–94
| TaShawn Thomas (19)
| TaShawn Thomas (10)
| Thomas, Travers, C.Webster (4)
| MyState Bank Arena4,293
| 14–12

|-style="background:#FFBBBB;"
| 27
| 3 February 
| Cairns
| L 71–84
| Bryce Cotton (28)
| Bryce Cotton (13)
| Bryce Cotton (7)
| RAC Arena11,668
| 14–13
|-style="background:#BBF3BB;"
| 28
| 5 February
| Sydney
| W 96–84
| Corey Webster (26)
| Luke Travers (11)
| Luke Travers (6)
| RAC Arena12,712
| 15–13

Postseason 

|-style="background:#BBF3BB;"
| 1
| 9 February 
| @ S.E. Melbourne
| W 99–106
| Bryce Cotton (26)
| Luke Travers (9)
| TaShawn Thomas (8)
| John Cain Arena5,176
| 1–0

|-style="background:#FFBBBB;"
| 2
| 12 February 
| @ Cairns
| L 91–78
| Bryce Cotton (19)
| Brady Manek (10)
| Bryce Cotton (10)
| Cairns Convention Centre3,020
| 1–1

Transactions

Re-signed

Additions

Subtractions

See also 
 2022–23 NBL season
 Perth Wildcats

References

External links 

 Official Website

Perth Wildcats
Perth Wildcats seasons
Perth Wildcats season